Rosiroia is a genus of leaf beetles in the subfamily Eumolpinae. It contains only one species, Rosiroia anisotomoides, and is the only member of the tribe Rosiroiini. It was described by the Czech entomologist Jan Bechyné in 1950. It is found in Madagascar. The genus is dedicated to Rosetta Roi (later Rosetta Kadlec), a taxidermist who worked at the Museum G. Frey.

References

Eumolpinae
Monotypic Chrysomelidae genera
Beetles of Africa
Insects of Madagascar
Endemic fauna of Madagascar